David Mindich is an American professor and historian. He is the chair of the journalism department at Temple University and the former chair of the journalism department at Saint Michael's College, and the author of Tuned Out: Why Americans Under 40 Don't Follow the News.

Career
Mindich was a professor and the chair of the journalism department at Saint Michael's College, where he taught from 1996 to 2017. While at Saint Michael's, he served as the faculty advisor for the Defender, the school's newspaper, as well as the Echo, its rival. As of 2021, he is the chair of the journalism department at Temple University. He is also the author of Tuned Out: Why Americans Under 40 Don't Follow the News and Just the Facts: How "Objectivity" Came to Define American Journalism.

Personal life
Mindich is Jewish.

Works
 Just the Facts: How "Objectivity" Came to Define American Journalism (NYU Press, 1998) 
 Tuned Out: Why Americans Under 40 Don't Follow the News (Oxford University Press, 2004)

References

External links

1963 births
Media historians
Living people